Luthrie is a village in the parish of Creich in Fife, Scotland. A small stream shown on maps as Windygates Burn (but know locally as Luthrie Burn) flows through the village and occasionally floods.

Notable buildings

Listed
There are two listed buildings in the village, both Grade C(S):
Old Smiddy House  
Lower Luthrie House a two-storey, four-window harled dated  (marked Luthrie House on most maps)

Other
Old School House 
Village Hall

Transportation

Luthrie had a station on the Newburgh and North Fife Railway which was open to passengers between 1909 and 1951. The railway has since been lifted.

See also
List of listed buildings in Creich, Fife
Newburgh and North Fife Railway

References

External links
Luthrie Village Hall

Villages in Fife